Freelance (US title: Con Man) is a 1971 British thriller film starring Ian McShane. It was written and directed by Francis Megahy.

Plot
Mitch (McShane) is a London con-artist. When he witnesses a gangland hit, he is forced to lie low whilst trying to carry out his own various schemes.

Background 
The film offers a portrayal of early 1970s west London.

Cast
Ian McShane – Mitch
Gayle Hunnicutt – Chris
Keith Barron – Gary
Alan Lake – Dean
Peter Gilmore – Boss
Luan Peters – Rosemary
Peter Birrel – Jeff
Elizabeth Proud – Gwen
Charles Hyatt – McNair
John Hollis – Hartley

References

External links 
 
 

1971 films
British thriller films
1970s thriller films
Films scored by Basil Kirchin
1970s English-language films
1970s British films
Films about con artists